816 Nuclear Military Plant is an unfinished Chinese underground nuclear weapons production facility and the largest man-made tunnel structure in the world. A military megaproject, the nuclear base is located near what is now suburban Fuling, a municipality in Chongqing, China. In 2010, it was opened to Chinese tourists. It is a distinct network of nuclear-weapons manufacturing tunnels to the likewise defunct Underground Project 131 and the still operational "Underground Great Wall of China."

History
The project was started in 1966 when Sino-Soviet relations dramatically declined (see also the Sino-Soviet split). To enhance China's national defence and prevent possible Soviet invasion and nuclear attack, the project was approved (directly by then-Premier Zhou Enlai) and undertaken in secret. More than 60,000 engineering soldiers of the People's Liberation Army participated in the construction of the base.  The underground base was designed to be able to tolerate thousands of tons of TNT explosives and 8-magnitude earthquakes.

The project was under construction for 17 years, and the construction was nearly completed in 1984. In 1964 China made its first public nuclear test. Largely due to change in the Cold War international situation, the project was cancelled in February 1984. It was further declassified in April 2002. In April 2010, after being closed for over 25 years, the base was opened to tourists.

Structure

The surface area of the cave is more than 104,000 m2, and the total length of the tunnels is more than 20 kilometers. The whole complex consists of 13 levels, 18 artificial caves linked to each other, and has more than 80 roads and 130 tunnels. Automobiles are able to pass the roads and tunnels inside. The base has the “World's Largest Artificial Cave”, which has a height of 79.6 meters, roughly equal to that of a 20-floor building.

See also
 Fallout Shelter
 Underground City (Beijing)
 Nuclear warfare
 Nuclear deterrent
 Nuclear strategy

References

External links 
 Geographical coordinates: 
 Pictures of the 816 Nuclear Military Plant 
 CCTV: Chongqing opens former Nuclear Plant as tourist attraction 

Secret military programs
Nuclear history of China
Nuclear program of the People's Republic of China
Military history of the People's Republic of China
Subterranean buildings and structures
Buildings and structures in Chongqing
Secret places
Cold War museums in China
China Projects